Harry Shaw may refer to:

Harry Shaw (footballer) (1905–1984), English footballer who played for Sunderland as a full back
Harry Shaw (ice hockey) (born 1943), retired Canadian professional ice hockey defenceman
Harry Straw, founder of Shaw Industries, Inc.
Harry Shaw-Reynolds, drums player with the Melbourne jazz quartet The Conglomerate

See also
Harold Shaw (disambiguation)
Henry Shaw (disambiguation)